Una Noche is a 2012 Cuban-set drama-thriller film. 

Una Noche may also refer to:

 Una Noche, a 2002 album by La Secta AllStar
 "Give Me Just One Night (Una Noche)", a song by 98 Degrees